The Super Derby is an American thoroughbred horse race held annually in September at Louisiana Downs in Bossier City, Louisiana.

Inaugurated in 1980, the Super Derby is open to three-year-olds and the distance is  miles on the dirt. Currently a Grade III event, it is the richest race held at Louisiana Downs. In its history, the Super Derby has attracted some of the top horses in the country including winners of all three American Classic Races.

The Super Derby was a Grade I race from 1983 to 2001. In 2002, it was downgraded to Grade II and in 2016, it was downgraded again to Grade III. It was originally run at the American classic distance of  miles, but in 2002 the distance was reduced to  miles (the exception being 2005 when the distance reverted to  miles). In 2017 the distance was set at  miles.

In summary:

In 2017, the Super Derby lost its graded status and changed surfaces from dirt to turf. "Today, there are a lot fewer 3-year-old races on the grass. We want our key race to have the best and largest field we can put out there, and making the move to the turf, there's an opportunity to have a better overall quality field", stated Trent McIntosh, the assistant general manager of Louisiana Downs.
  miles – 2002–2004, 2006–2016
  miles – 1980–2001, 2005
  miles – 2017 – present
 Dirt – 1980–2016
 Turf – 2017 – present

The 2020 Super Derby, what was to be the 40th running, was canceled due to the COVID-19 pandemic.

Records
Speed record:
 1:48.36 – My Pal Charlie (2008) (at  miles)
 1:59.84 – Tiznow (2000) (at  miles)
 1:42.91 – Mr. Misunderstood (2017) (at  miles)

Most wins by a jockey:
 3 – Eddie Maple (1980, 1985, 1986),
 3 – Laffit Pincay, Jr. (1981, 1983, 1984)
 3 – Chris McCarron (1987, 1997, 2000)

Most wins by a trainer:
 3 – Albert Stall Jr. (2008, 2010, 2013)Most wins by an owner:'''
 2 – Russell L. Reineman Stables (1986, 1990)

Winners

 † Race run on turf.

References

 Louisiana Downs site
 Ten Things You Should Know About the Super Derby at Hello Race Fans!

Graded stakes races in the United States
Flat horse races for three-year-olds
Horse races in Louisiana
1980 establishments in Louisiana
Recurring sporting events established in 1980
Bossier City, Louisiana